{{Infobox person
| name               = Megumi Hayashibara
| image              = 
| alt                = 
| caption            = 
| native_name        = 林原 めぐみ
| native_name_lang   = ja
| birth_name         = 
| birth_date         = 
| birth_place        = Kita, Tokyo, Japan
| death_date         = 
| death_place        = 
| other_names        = MEGUMI
| occupation         = 
| years_active       = 1986–present
| agent              = Woodpark Office
| credits            = {{unbulleted list|Neon Genesis Evangelion as Rei Ayanami|
Slayers as Lina Inverse|Detective Conan as Ai Haibara|Ranma ½ as Ranma Saotome (female)|Cowboy Bebop as Faye Valentine|Pokémon as Musashi/Jessie|Saber Marionette J as Lime|Magical Princess Minky Momo (1991) as Minky Momo of Marinarsa|Mashin Hero Wataru series as Himiko Shinobibe}}
| height             = 155 cm
| children           = 1
| website            = 
| module             = 
}}
 is a Japanese voice actress, singer, lyricist and radio personality from Kita ward in Tokyo and is affiliated with self-founded Woodpark Office. One of the most prominent Japanese voice actresses since the 1990s, Hayashibara is best known for her roles in Neon Genesis Evangelion, Love Hina, Saber Marionette J, Magical Princess Minky Momo, Mashin Hero Wataru, Ranma ½, Cowboy Bebop, Slayers, Detective Conan, Pokémon, All Purpose Cultural Catgirl Nuku Nuku, Video Girl Ai, and Shaman King where she also performs the opening themes for the 2001 series, Over Soul and Northern Lights, as well as the 2021 adaptations theme Soul Salvation.

Biography

Hayashibara was born on March 30, 1967, in Kita Tokyo, Japan. She studied at a Catholic school and at one point was bullied in fifth grade. She was an active club member and participated in the Badminton, Biology, Broadcasting, Drama and English clubs. She played the role of Alice in an English language production of Alice in Wonderland. Despite qualifying as a nurse, she has never been employed in a nursing position.

On March 30, 1998, Hayashibara got married. On January 10, 2004, Hayashibara announced on her radio show that she was pregnant with her first child. On June 28 of the same year, she gave birth to her daughter by via caesarian section.

Voice acting
On the same day as submitting the application for nursing school, Hayashibara went to a book store and found an advert offering free anime voice acting auditions at Arts Vision. Several months after submitting a demo tape, she received a confirmation of passing the first stage of the audition, and eventually decided to continue training as a nurse while doing voice acting. In 1986, after a year of voice actor training, Hayashibara was chosen to voice small roles on Maison Ikkoku. Initially, she had difficulty with her lines and had to redo many lines after the main recording sessions. Hayashibara later auditioned for Ranma ½ expecting to be cast as Akane Tendo, but was cast as the female half of Ranma Saotome instead. In 1993 and 1995, Hayashibara was a guest at Anime America. At the 1995 event, she decided to give a speech in English after believing the translation at the 1993 event did not reflect what she had said. In 1995, Hayashibara provided the voice of Rei Ayanami in Neon Genesis Evangelion, a role referred to as "innovative casting".

In addition to voicing Musashi/Jessie of Team Rocket in Pokémon, Hayashibara has also voiced Ash's Pidgeotto and Pidgeot, May's Skitty, Whitney's Miltank, Clair's Dratini and Dragonair, Latios, Latias, and Anabel's Espeon in both the Japanese and English-language versions of the anime. She also provides the voice for Ai Haibara in the ongoing anime series, Detective Conan.

While Hayashibara rarely voices male characters, she voiced as Shuichi Saihara in Danganronpa V3: Killing Harmony due to her deep and vast experience connected to detective characters. She has actually helped the team on making Shuichi more detective-like.

In 2001 Hayashibara was cast as Anna Kyoyama In the anime adaptation of the Shonen series Shaman King while also performing the opening themes Over Soul and Northern Lights. Twenty years later she reprised her role as Anna in the 2021 remake and performed the first opening theme Soul Salvation and the first ending theme #Boku no Yubisaki. Over Soul was used as the credits song for episode 5. Hayashibara's 2010 song Osorezan Revoir would also be used as the ending theme of episode 33: which concluded the Osorezan Revoir arc of the story.

DJ
While at nursing school, Hayashibara started a temporary job as a DJ at a local ice skating rink. After becoming better known as a voice actress, she was given her own radio show, Heartful Station. After 17 shows, the broadcasting station cancelled the show and other anime related programming to concentrate on traditional music. However, six months later, Hayashibara started a new radio show at another broadcaster.

Writing
Hayashibara wrote a series of manga for Anime V magazine, with artwork by Sakura Asagi. The comics, known as "Megumi-Toons", talked about her personal life and career. The individual chapters were collected into the book , which has been reprinted several times. Hayashibara has also contributed two columns to Newtype magazine; Aitakute Aitakute, and Speaking in Character. Aitakute Aitakute is a series of interviews conducted by Hayashibara with people from all walks of life. Three compilations of the column have been published. Speaking in Character has been translated into English for Newtype USA.

In February 2021, Yen Press announced the release of Hayashibara's memoir The Characters Taught Me Everything: Living Life One Episode at a Time, in which she examines her career and the ways the characters she portrayed in various anime series affected it. The book is currently available for digital release, with the physical release slated for August 2021.

Filmography
Television animation

Original video animation (OVA)

Anime films

Video games

Dubbing roles

Drama CD

Discography
Albums

Singles

Substitutes
 Akiko Hiramatsu—Pokemon: Advanced Generation'': Musashi

References

External links
  
  
 
 
 
 
 

1967 births
Living people
Anime singers
Japanese women pop singers
Japanese women rock singers
Japanese women singer-songwriters
Japanese radio personalities
Japanese video game actresses
Japanese voice actresses
King Records (Japan) artists
Singers from Tokyo
Universal Music Japan artists
Voice actresses from Tokyo
20th-century Japanese actresses
20th-century Japanese women singers
20th-century Japanese singers
21st-century Japanese actresses
21st-century Japanese women singers
21st-century Japanese singers
Arts Vision voice actors